Mohamed Ould Brahim (born 3 January 1968), is a Mauritanian athlete.

Brahim competed in the 200 metres at the 1996 Summer Olympics, he finished 8th in his heat so didn't qualify for the next round.

References

1968 births
Living people
Olympic athletes of Mauritania
Mauritanian male sprinters
Athletes (track and field) at the 1996 Summer Olympics